As I Was Saying is a British television drama which aired in 1955 on the BBC. Of the six episodes produced, only three survive, but are unavailable for public viewing. Nonetheless, they are some of the earliest surviving examples of episodic British drama by the BBC.

References

External links
As I Was Saying on IMDb

1955 British television series debuts
1955 British television series endings
Lost BBC episodes
English-language television shows
1950s British drama television series
Black-and-white British television shows
BBC television dramas